Kimbugwe Kamegere was Kabaka of the Kingdom of Buganda between 1634 and 1644. He was the thirteenth Kabaka of Buganda.

Claim to the throne
He was born at Kongojje, the youngest son of Suuna I Kisolo, Kabaka of Buganda between 1584 and 1614. His mother was Naluggwa of the Ndiga clan, the second wife of his father. He ascended to the throne after the death of his cousin, Kabaka Sekamaanya Kisolo. He established his capital at Bugwaanya.

Married life
He had three wives:

 Nakamyuuka, daughter of Mukusu, of the Mpindi clan
 Nakunja, daughter of Sekayiba, of the Mbogo clan
 Nabakyaala Nabuuso, the Naabagareka, daughter of Gunju, of the Butiko clan and widow of his predecessor, Kabaka Sekamaanya Kisolo, Kabaka of Buganda, who ruled between 1614 and 1634.

Issue
He fathered two sons:

 Prince (Omulangira) Kamyuuka, whose mother was Nakamyuuka
 Prince (Omulangira) Baleke, whose mother was Nakamyuuka

The final years
He was killed, allegedly by witchcraft by his stepson, Prince Kateregga, who succeeded him to the throne, circa 1644. He is buried at Bugwaanya, Busiro.

Succession table

References

External links
List of the Kings of Buganda

Kabakas of Buganda
17th-century African people
1644 deaths